Jama Masjid in Erandol, India, is a centuries-old Muslim place of worship.  It has the form of a large quadrangle surrounded by a wall with beautiful inscriptions of Quranic verses and with windows with stone lattice work of various patterns. On either side of the mehrab (imam's praying place) are arched recesses surrounded by beautiful and varied scroll work, with the crescent and star on the tops of each. The central Masjid has a massive roof of great blocks and beams of stone still bearing traces of red and yellow colouring, the whole supported on large stone pillars ornamented with flowers.

Mosques in Maharashtra
Jalgaon district
Erandol